In fluid dynamics, the Darcy–Weisbach equation is an empirical equation that relates the head loss, or pressure loss, due to friction along a given length of pipe to the average velocity of the fluid flow for an incompressible fluid. The equation is named after Henry Darcy and Julius Weisbach. Currently, there is no formula more accurate or universally applicable than the Darcy-Weisbach supplemented by the Moody diagram or Colebrook equation.

The Darcy–Weisbach equation contains a dimensionless friction factor, known as the Darcy friction factor. This is also variously called the Darcy–Weisbach friction factor, friction factor, resistance coefficient, or flow coefficient.

Pressure-loss equation 
In a cylindrical pipe of uniform diameter , flowing full, the pressure loss due to viscous effects  is proportional to length  and can be characterized by the Darcy–Weisbach equation:

where the pressure loss per unit length  (SI units: Pa/m) is a function of: 
 , the density of the fluid (kg/m3);
 , the hydraulic diameter of the pipe (for a pipe of circular section, this equals ; otherwise  for a pipe of cross-sectional area  and perimeter ) (m);
 , the Darcy friction factor (also called flow coefficient ).
For laminar flow in a circular pipe of diameter , the friction factor is inversely proportional to the Reynolds number alone which itself can be expressed in terms of easily measured or published physical quantities (see section below). Making this substitution the Darcy–Weisbach equation is rewritten as

where
  is the dynamic viscosity of the fluid (Pa·s = N·s/m2 = kg/(m·s));

Note that this laminar form of Darcy–Weisbach is equivalent to the Hagen–Poiseuille equation, which is analytically derived from the Navier–Stokes equations.

Head-loss form 
The head loss   (or ) expresses the pressure loss due to friction in terms of the equivalent height of a column of the working fluid, so the pressure drop is

where:

  = The head loss due to pipe friction over the given length of pipe (SI units: m);
  = The local acceleration due to gravity (m/s2).

It is useful to present head loss per length of pipe (dimensionless):

where  is the pipe length (m).

Therefore, the Darcy–Weisbach equation can also be written in terms of head loss:

In terms of volumetric flow 
The relationship between mean flow velocity  and volumetric flow rate  is

where:
  = The volumetric flow (m3/s),
  = The cross-sectional wetted area (m2).

In a full-flowing, circular pipe of diameter ,

Shear-stress form

The mean wall shear stress  in a pipe or open channel is expressed in terms of the Darcy–Weisbach friction factor as

The wall shear stress has the SI unit of pascals (Pa).

Darcy friction factor 

The friction factor  is not a constant: it depends on such things as the characteristics of the pipe (diameter  and roughness height ), the characteristics of the fluid (its kinematic viscosity  [nu]), and the velocity of the fluid flow . It has been measured to high accuracy within certain flow regimes and may be evaluated by the use of various empirical relations, or it may be read from published charts. These charts are often referred to as Moody diagrams, after L. F. Moody, and hence the factor itself is sometimes erroneously called the Moody friction factor. It is also sometimes called the Blasius friction factor, after the approximate formula he proposed.

There are three broad regimes of fluid flow encountered in these data: laminar, critical, and turbulent.

Laminar regime 
For laminar (smooth) flows, it is a consequence of Poiseuille's law (which stems from an exact classical solution for the fluid flow) that

where  is the Reynolds number

 

and where  is the viscosity of the fluid and 

is known as the kinematic viscosity. In this expression for Reynolds number, the characteristic length  is taken to be the hydraulic diameter of the pipe, which, for a cylindrical pipe flowing full, equals the inside diameter. In Figures 1 and 2 of friction factor versus Reynolds number, the regime  demonstrates laminar flow; the friction factor is well represented by the above equation.

In effect, the friction loss in the laminar regime is more accurately characterized as being proportional to flow velocity, rather than proportional to the square of that velocity: one could regard the Darcy–Weisbach equation as not truly applicable in the laminar flow regime.

In laminar flow, friction loss arises from the transfer of momentum from the fluid in the center of the flow to the pipe wall via the viscosity of the fluid; no vortices are present in the flow. Note that the friction loss is insensitive to the pipe roughness height : the flow velocity in the neighborhood of the pipe wall is zero.

Critical regime 
For Reynolds numbers in the range , the flow is unsteady (varies grossly with time) and varies from one section of the pipe to another (is not "fully developed"). The flow involves the incipient formation of vortices; it is not well understood.

Turbulent regime 

For Reynolds number greater than 4000, the flow is turbulent; the resistance to flow follows the Darcy–Weisbach equation: it is proportional to the square of the mean flow velocity. Within the turbulent flow regime, the nature of the flow can be further divided into a regime where the pipe wall is effectively smooth, and one where its roughness height is salient.

Smooth-pipe regime

When the pipe surface is smooth (the "smooth pipe" curve in Figure 2), the friction factor's variation with Re can be modeled by the Kármán–Prandtl resistance equation for turbulent flow in smooth pipes with the parameters suitably adjusted

 

The numbers 1.930 and 0.537 are phenomenological; these specific values provide a fairly good fit to the data.

In the Kármán–Prandtl resistance equation,  can be expressed in closed form as an analytic function of  through the use of the Lambert  function:

 

In this flow regime, many small vortices are responsible for the transfer of momentum between the bulk of the fluid to the pipe wall. As the friction Reynolds number  increases, the profile of the fluid velocity approaches the wall asymptotically, thereby transferring more momentum to the pipe wall, as modeled in Blasius boundary layer theory.

Rough-pipe regime

When the pipe surface's roughness height  is significant (typically at high Reynolds number), the friction factor departs from the smooth pipe curve, ultimately approaching an asymptotic value ("rough pipe" regime). In this regime, the resistance to flow varies according to the square of the mean flow velocity and is insensitive to Reynolds number. Here, it is useful to employ yet another dimensionless parameter of the flow, the roughness Reynolds number

 

where the roughness height  is scaled to the pipe diameter .

It is illustrative to plot the roughness function :

 

Figure 3 shows  versus  for the rough pipe data of Nikuradse, Shockling, and Langelandsvik.

In this view, the data at different roughness ratio  fall together when plotted against , demonstrating scaling in the variable . The following features are present:
 When , then  is identically zero: flow is always in the smooth pipe regime. The data for these points lie to the left extreme of the abscissa and are not within the frame of the graph. 
 When , the data lie on the line ;  flow is in the smooth pipe regime. 
 The intermediate range of  constitutes a transition from one behavior to the other. The data depart from the line  very slowly, reach a maximum near , then fall to a constant value.

 

This function shares the same values for its term in common with the Kármán–Prandtl resistance equation, plus one parameter 0.34 to fit the asymptotic behavior for  along with one further parameter, 11, to govern the transition from smooth to rough flow. It is exhibited in Figure 3.

The Colebrook–White relation fits the friction factor with a function of the form

However its performance in the transitional domain overestimates the friction factor by a substantial margin. Colebrook acknowledges the discrepancy with Nikuradze's data but argues that his relation is consistent with the measurements on commercial pipes. Indeed, such pipes are very different from those carefully prepared by Nikuradse: their surfaces are characterized by many different roughness heights and random spatial distribution of roughness points, while those of Nikuradse have surfaces with uniform roughness height, with the points extremely closely packed.

Calculating the friction factor from its parametrization 

For turbulent flow, methods for finding the friction factor  include using a diagram, such as the Moody chart, or solving equations such as the Colebrook–White equation (upon which the Moody chart is based), or the Swamee–Jain equation. While the Colebrook–White relation is, in the general case, an iterative method, the Swamee–Jain equation allows  to be found directly for full flow in a circular pipe.

Direct calculation when friction loss  is known 
In typical engineering applications, there will be a set of given or known quantities. The acceleration of gravity  and the kinematic viscosity of the fluid  are known, as are the diameter of the pipe  and its roughness height . If as well the head loss per unit length  is a known quantity, then the friction factor  can be calculated directly from the chosen fitting function.

we can now express :

Expressing the roughness Reynolds number ,

we have the two parameters needed to substitute into the Colebrook–White relation, or any other function, for the friction factor , the flow velocity , and the volumetric flow rate .

Confusion with the Fanning friction factor 
The Darcy–Weisbach friction factor  is 4 times larger than the Fanning friction factor , so attention must be paid to note which one of these is meant in any "friction factor" chart or equation being used. Of the two, the Darcy–Weisbach factor  is more commonly used by civil and mechanical engineers, and the Fanning factor  by chemical engineers, but care should be taken to identify the correct factor regardless of the source of the chart or formula.

Note that

 

Most charts or tables indicate the type of friction factor, or at least provide the formula for the friction factor with laminar flow.

Which friction factor is plotted in a Moody diagram may be determined by inspection if the publisher did not include the formula described above:
Observe the value of the friction factor for laminar flow at a Reynolds number of 1000.
If the value of the friction factor is 0.064, then the Darcy friction factor is plotted in the Moody diagram.  Note that the nonzero digits in 0.064 are the numerator in the formula for the laminar Darcy friction factor: .
If the value of the friction factor is 0.016, then the Fanning friction factor is plotted in the Moody diagram.  Note that the nonzero digits in 0.016 are the numerator in the formula for the laminar Fanning friction factor: .

The procedure above is similar for any available Reynolds number that is an integer power of ten.  It is not necessary to remember the value 1000 for this procedure—only that an integer power of ten is of interest for this purpose.

History 
Historically this equation arose as a variant on the Prony equation; this variant was developed by Henry Darcy of France, and further refined into the form used today by Julius Weisbach of Saxony in 1845. In later years it was eschewed in many special-case situations in favor of a variety of empirical equations valid only for certain flow regimes, notably the Hazen–Williams equation or the Manning equation, most of which were significantly easier to use in calculations. However, since the advent of the calculator, ease of calculation is no longer a major issue, and so the Darcy–Weisbach equation's generality has made it the preferred one.

Derivation by dimensional analysis 
Away from the ends of the pipe, the characteristics of the flow are independent of the position along the pipe. The key quantities are then the pressure drop along the pipe per unit length, and the volumetric flow rate. The flow rate can be converted to a mean flow velocity  by dividing by the wetted area of the flow (which equals the cross-sectional area of the pipe if the pipe is full of fluid).

Pressure has dimensions of energy per unit volume, therefore the pressure drop between two points must be proportional to the dynamic pressure q. We also know that pressure must be proportional to the length of the pipe between the two points  as the pressure drop per unit length is a constant. To turn the relationship into a proportionality coefficient  of dimensionless quantity, we can divide by the hydraulic diameter of the pipe, which is also constant along the pipe. Therefore,

The proportionality coefficient is the dimensionless "Darcy friction factor" or "flow coefficient".

Note that the dynamic pressure is not the kinetic energy of the fluid per unit volume, for the following reasons. Even in the case of laminar flow, where all the flow lines are parallel to the length of the pipe, the velocity of the fluid on the inner surface of the pipe is zero due to viscosity, and the velocity in the center of the pipe must therefore be larger than the average velocity obtained by dividing the volumetric flow rate by the wet area. The average kinetic energy then involves the root mean-square velocity, which always exceeds the mean velocity. In the case of turbulent flow, the fluid acquires random velocity components in all directions, including perpendicular to the length of the pipe, and thus turbulence contributes to the kinetic energy per unit volume but not to the average lengthwise velocity of the fluid.

Practical application
In a hydraulic engineering application, it is typical for the volumetric flow  within a pipe (that is, its productivity) and the head loss per unit length  (the concomitant power consumption) to be the critical important factors. The practical consequence is that, for a fixed volumetric flow rate , head loss  decreases with the inverse fifth power of the pipe diameter, .  Doubling the diameter of a pipe of a given schedule (say, ANSI schedule 40) roughly doubles the amount of material required per unit length and thus its installed cost. Meanwhile, the head loss is decreased by a factor of 32 (about a 97% reduction). Thus the energy consumed in moving a given volumetric flow of the fluid is cut down dramatically for a modest increase in capital cost.

Advantages 
The Darcy-Weisbach's accuracy and universal applicability makes it the ideal formula for flow in pipes. The advantages of the equation are as follows:

 It is based on fundamentals.
 It is dimensionally consistent.
 It is useful for any fluid, including oil, gas, brine, and sludges.
 It can be derived analytically in the laminar flow region.
 It is useful in the transition region between laminar flow and fully developed turbulent flow.
 The friction factor variation is well documented.

See also
 Bernoulli's principle
 Darcy friction factor formulae
 Euler number
 Friction loss
 Hazen–Williams equation
 Hagen–Poiseuille equation
 Water pipe

Notes

References

18. Afzal, Noor (2013) "Roughness effects of commercial steel pipe in turbulent flow:
Universal scaling". Canadian Journal of Civil Engineering  40,  188-193.

Further reading

External links
  The History of the Darcy–Weisbach Equation 
 Darcy–Weisbach equation calculator
 Pipe pressure drop calculator for single phase flows.
 Pipe pressure drop calculator for two phase flows.
 Open source pipe pressure drop calculator.
 Web application with pressure drop calculations for pipes and ducts

Dimensionless numbers of fluid mechanics
Equations of fluid dynamics
Piping